"Sleep Through the Static" is third single from American singer/songwriter Jack Johnson's third studio album Sleep Through the Static.

The track features a short melodic opening played on a melodica with drums, electric guitar and bass following. The song features some complex lyrics, with a blues feeling and the representative Jack Johnson's groove.

Johnson implied in an interview with National Public Radio that the song was made to protest the Iraq War.

Charts

External links
 "Sleep Through the Static" lyrics

References

2007 singles
Jack Johnson (musician) songs
Songs written by Jack Johnson (musician)
2007 songs
Universal Records singles